Dog Patch is an unincorporated community in Logan County, West Virginia, United States.

References 

Unincorporated communities in West Virginia